Anjala Zaveri is a British actress who has primarily appeared in Telugu and Hindi language films.

Personal life
Zaveri was born in a Gujarati family in Portsmouth, London. She is married to Tarun Arora.

Career
Zaveri was selected by Vinod Khanna in a nationwide search in England for the film Himalay Putra, which also marked Vinod's son Akshaye Khanna's film debut. She acted in Betaabi. Zaveri starred in the 1998 blockbuster romantic comedy, Pyaar Kiya To Darna Kya, starring Salman Khan and Kajol. In the same year, she starred opposite Chiranjeevi in the Telugu movie, Choodalani Vundi.

She was very successful in Tollywood films. She was introduced to Tollywood by Suresh Productions in the movie Preminchukundam Raa opposite Venkatesh and has shared screen with him again in Devi Putrudu.

Filmography

References

External links 
 

Year of birth missing (living people)
British actresses
British people of Indian descent
Living people
Actresses from London
Actresses in Tamil cinema
Actresses in Telugu cinema
Indian film actresses
Actresses in Hindi cinema
Actresses in Malayalam cinema
Actresses in Kannada cinema